Nowy Dwór (Polish for "new manor") may refer to:

Nowy Dwór Gdański, in Pomeranian Voivodeship (north Poland)
Nowy Dwór Mazowiecki, in Masovian Voivodeship (east-central Poland)
Nowy Dwór, Oleśnica County in Lower Silesian Voivodeship (south-west Poland)
Nowy Dwór, Oława County in Lower Silesian Voivodeship (south-west Poland)
Nowy Dwór, Polkowice County in Lower Silesian Voivodeship (south-west Poland)
Nowy Dwór, Trzebnica County in Lower Silesian Voivodeship (south-west Poland)
Nowy Dwór, Ząbkowice Śląskie County in Lower Silesian Voivodeship (south-west Poland)
Nowy Dwór, Brodnica County in Kuyavian-Pomeranian Voivodeship (north-central Poland)
Nowy Dwór, Gmina Dąbrowa Chełmińska in Kuyavian-Pomeranian Voivodeship (north-central Poland)
Nowy Dwór, Gmina Koronowo in Kuyavian-Pomeranian Voivodeship (north-central Poland)
Nowy Dwór, Golub-Dobrzyń County in Kuyavian-Pomeranian Voivodeship (north-central Poland)
Nowy Dwór, Grudziądz County in Kuyavian-Pomeranian Voivodeship (north-central Poland)
Nowy Dwór, Inowrocław County in Kuyavian-Pomeranian Voivodeship (north-central Poland)
Nowy Dwór, Radziejów County in Kuyavian-Pomeranian Voivodeship (north-central Poland)
Nowy Dwór, Sępólno County in Kuyavian-Pomeranian Voivodeship (north-central Poland)
Nowy Dwór, Biała Podlaska County in Lublin Voivodeship (east Poland)
Nowy Dwór, Sokółka County in Podlaskie Voivodeship (north-east Poland)
Nowy Dwór, Suwałki County in Podlaskie Voivodeship (north-east Poland)
Nowy Dwór, Łódź Voivodeship (central Poland)
Nowy Dwór, Lublin County in Lublin Voivodeship (east Poland)
Nowy Dwór, Masovian Voivodeship (east-central Poland)
Nowy Dwór, Świętokrzyskie Voivodeship (south-central Poland)
Nowy Dwór, Chodzież County in Greater Poland Voivodeship (west-central Poland)
Nowy Dwór, Kościan County in Greater Poland Voivodeship (west-central Poland)
Nowy Dwór, Nowy Tomyśl County in Greater Poland Voivodeship (west-central Poland)
Nowy Dwór, Piła County in Greater Poland Voivodeship (west-central Poland)
Nowy Dwór, Złotów County in Greater Poland Voivodeship (west-central Poland)
Nowy Dwór, Lubliniec County in Silesian Voivodeship (south Poland)
Nowy Dwór, Wodzisław County in Silesian Voivodeship (south Poland)
Nowy Dwór, Międzyrzecz County in Lubusz Voivodeship (west Poland)
Nowy Dwór, Żagań County in Lubusz Voivodeship (west Poland)
Nowy Dwór, Głubczyce County in Opole Voivodeship (south-west Poland)
Nowy Dwór, Namysłów County in Opole Voivodeship (south-west Poland)
Nowy Dwór, Chojnice County in Pomeranian Voivodeship (north Poland)
Nowy Dwór, Gmina Somonino in Pomeranian Voivodeship (north Poland)
Nowy Dwór, Gmina Sulęczyno in Pomeranian Voivodeship (north Poland)
Nowy Dwór, Kwidzyn County in Pomeranian Voivodeship (north Poland)
Nowy Dwór, Starogard County in Pomeranian Voivodeship (north Poland)
Nowy Dwór, Gmina Łęczyce in Pomeranian Voivodeship (north Poland)
Nowy Dwór, Działdowo County in Warmian-Masurian Voivodeship (north Poland)
Nowy Dwór, Elbląg County in Warmian-Masurian Voivodeship (north Poland)
Nowy Dwór, Lidzbark County in Warmian-Masurian Voivodeship (north Poland)
Nowy Dwór, Ostróda County in Warmian-Masurian Voivodeship (north Poland)
Nowy Dwór, Szczytno County in Warmian-Masurian Voivodeship (north Poland)

See also
Nowodwór (disambiguation)
Novy Dvor, several localities in Belarus, Russia
Nový Dvůr (disambiguation)